The Statute Law (Repeals) Act 1978 (c 45) is an Act of the Parliament of the United Kingdom.

This Act was partly in force in Great Britain at the end of 2010.

It implemented recommendations contained in the ninth report on statute law revision, by the Law Commission and the Scottish Law Commission.

Section 1
Section 1(1) was repealed by Group 2 of Part IX of Schedule 1 to the Statute Law (Repeals) Act 1998.

Section 2
This section was repealed by section 1(1) of, and Part IV of Schedule 1 to, the Statute Law (Repeals) Act 1995.

Section 3
In section 3(2), the words "or the Isle of Man" were repealed by Group 2 of Part IX of Schedule 1 to the Statute Law (Repeals) Act 1998.

Orders under this section

The power conferred by section 3(2) was exercised by the Statute Law Repeals (Isle of Man) Order 1984 (SI 1984/1692).

The Orders in Council made under section 3(2) have lapsed because of the repeal made to that section by the Statute Law (Repeals) Act 1998.

Schedule 1
This Schedule was repealed by Group 2 of Part IX of Schedule 1 to the Statute Law (Repeals) Act 1998.

Schedule 3
Paragraph 1 of this Schedule authorised the citation by short titles of three Acts passed between 1554 and 1854. This Schedule was repealed by section 1(1) of, and Part IV of Schedule 1 to, the Statute Law (Repeals) Act 1995.

See also
Statute Law (Repeals) Act

References
Halsbury's Statutes. Fourth Edition. 2008 Reissue. Volume 41. Page 835.
Peter Allsop (General editor). Current Law Statutes Annotated 1978. Sweet & Maxwell, Stevens & sons. London. W Green & son. Edinburgh. 1978. Volume 2.
The Public General Acts and General Synod Measures 1978. HMSO. London. 1979. Part II. Pages 1095 to 1137.
HL Deb vol 390, col 1979, vol 391, cols 1160 to 1162, vol 395, col 321, HC Deb vol 954, cols 1104 to 1105.

External links

United Kingdom Acts of Parliament 1978